The compact weaver (Ploceus superciliosus) is a species of bird in the family Ploceidae.
It is found in Angola, Benin, Burkina Faso, Burundi, Cameroon, Central African Republic, Republic of the Congo, Democratic Republic of the Congo, Ivory Coast, Ethiopia, Gabon, Ghana, Guinea, Guinea-Bissau, Kenya, Liberia, Nigeria, Rwanda, Senegal, Sierra Leone, Sudan, Tanzania, Togo, Uganda, and Zambia.

Some authorities, including Sibley & Monroe, and James Clements, place this species in the monotypic genus Pachyphantes. The construction of the nest of the compact weaver suggests an affinity with the thick-billed weaver Amblyospiza, which could put it in the subfamily Amblyospizinae.

Its natural habitat is subtropical or tropical seasonally wet or flooded lowland grassland.

References

External links
 Compact weaver -  Species text in Weaver Watch.

compact weaver
Birds of Sub-Saharan Africa
compact weaver
Taxonomy articles created by Polbot